Béla Bollobás FRS (born 3 August 1943) is a Hungarian-born British mathematician who has worked in various areas of mathematics, including functional analysis, combinatorics, graph theory, and percolation. He was strongly influenced by Paul Erdős since the age of 14.

Early life and education
As a student, he took part in the first three International Mathematical Olympiads, winning two gold medals. Paul Erdős invited Bollobás to lunch after hearing about his victories, and they kept in touch afterward. Bollobás' first publication was a joint publication with Erdős on extremal problems in graph theory, written when he was in high school in 1962.

With Erdős's recommendation to Harold Davenport and a long struggle for permission from the Hungarian authorities, Bollobás was able to spend an undergraduate year in Cambridge, England. However, the authorities denied his request to return to Cambridge for doctoral study. A similar scholarship offer from Paris was also quashed. He wrote his first doctorate in discrete geometry under the supervision of László Fejes Tóth and Paul Erdős in Budapest University, 1967, after which he spent a year in Moscow with Israïl Moiseevich Gelfand. After spending a year at Christ Church, Oxford, where Michael Atiyah held the Savilian Chair of Geometry, he vowed never to return to Hungary due to his disillusion with the 1956 Soviet intervention. He then went to Trinity College, Cambridge, where in 1972 he received a second PhD in functional analysis, studying Banach algebras under the supervision of Frank Adams. Bollobás recalled, "By then, I said to myself, 'If I ever manage to leave Hungary, I won't return.'" In 1970, he was awarded a fellowship to the college.

His main area of research is combinatorics, particularly graph theory. His chief interests are in extremal graph theory and random graph theory. In 1996 he resigned his university post, but remained a Fellow of Trinity College, Cambridge.

Career
Bollobás has been a Fellow of Trinity College, Cambridge, since 1970; in 1996 he was appointed to the Jabie Hardin Chair of Excellence at the University of Memphis, and in 2005 he was awarded a senior research fellowship at Trinity College.

Bollobás has proved results on extremal graph theory, functional analysis, the theory of random graphs, graph polynomials and percolation. For example, with Paul Erdős he proved results about the structure of dense graphs; he was the first to prove detailed results about the phase transition in the evolution of random graphs; he proved that the chromatic number of the random graph on n vertices is asymptotically n/2 log n; with Imre Leader he proved basic discrete isoperimetric inequalities; with Richard Arratia and Gregory Sorkin he constructed the interlace polynomial; with Oliver Riordan he introduced the ribbon polynomial (now called the Bollobás–Riordan polynomial); with Andrew Thomason, József Balogh, Miklós Simonovits, Robert Morris and Noga Alon he studied monotone and hereditary graph properties; with Paul Smith and Andrew Uzzell he introduced and classified random cellular automata with general homogeneous monotone update rules; with József Balogh, Hugo Duminil-Copin and Robert Morris he studied bootstrap percolation; with Oliver Riordan he proved that the critical probability in random Voronoi percolation in the plane is 1/2; and with Svante Janson and Oliver Riordan he introduced a very general model of heterogeneous sparse random graphs.

In addition to over 350 research papers on mathematics, Bollobás  has written several books, including the research monographs Extremal Graph Theory in 1978, Random Graphs in 1985 and Percolation (with Oliver Riordan) in 2006, the introductory books Modern Graph Theory for undergraduate courses in 1979, Combinatorics and Linear Analysis in 1990, and the collection of problems The Art of Mathematics – Coffee Time in Memphis in 2006, with drawings by Gabriella Bollobás. He has also edited a number of books, including Littlewood's Miscellany.

Bollobás's research students have included Keith Ball at Warwick, Graham Brightwell at LSE, Timothy Gowers (who was awarded a Fields Medal in 1998 and is Rouse Ball Professor of Mathematics), Imre Leader at the University of Cambridge, Jonathan Partington at Leeds, and Charles Read at Leeds, who died in 2015.

Bollobás is an External Member of the Hungarian Academy of Sciences; in 2007 he was awarded the Senior Whitehead Prize by the London Mathematical Society. In 2011 he was elected a Fellow of the Royal Society for his major contributions to many
different areas of mathematics within the broad field of combinatorics, including random graphs, percolation, extremal graphs, set systems and isoperimetric inequalities. The citation also recognises the profound influence of his
textbooks in many of these areas, and his key role in establishing Britain as one of the leading countries in probabilistic and extremal combinatorics. In 2012 he became a fellow of the American Mathematical Society.

Awards and honours
Bollobás was elected a Fellow of the Royal Society in 2011. His nomination reads 

In 1998 he was an invited speaker of the International Congress of Mathematicians in Berlin. He was elected Foreign Member of the Polish Academy of Sciences in 2013 and received an honorary doctorate from Adam Mickiewicz University, Poznań in 2013.  In 2016, he received the Bocskai Prize.  In 2017, he received the Széchenyi Prize and became a Member of the Academy of Europea.

Personal life
His father was a physician. His wife, Gabriella Bollobás, born in Budapest, was an actress and a musician  in Hungary before moving to England to become a sculptor. She made busts of mathematicians and scientists, including Paul Erdős, Bill Tutte, George Batchelor, John von Neumann, Paul Dirac, and Stephen Hawking, as well as a cast bronze of David Hilbert. He has one son, Mark.

Bollobás is also a sportsman, having represented the University of Oxford at modern pentathlon and the University of Cambridge at fencing.

Bollobás has been recorded on news camera yelling "Gurcsány!" (name of previous, left-wing prime minister) and "Traitors!" (Hazaárulók) at people protesting against certain policies of the government of Viktor Orbán

Selected works
 Extremal Graph Theory. Academic Press 1978, Dover 2004 (see here).
 Graph theory- an introductory course. Springer 1979, .
 Random Graphs. Academic Press 1985. Cambridge University Press 2001 .
 Combinatorics - set systems, hypergraphs, families of vectors, and combinatorial probability. Cambridge University Press 1986 .
 Linear Analysis – an introductory course. Cambridge University Press 1990, 1999 .
 with Alan Baker, András Hajnal (ed.): A tribute to Paul Erdös. Cambridge University Press 1990 .
 (ed.): Probabilistic combinatorics and its applications. American Mathematical Society 1991 .
 with Andrew Thomason (ed.): Combinatorics, Geometry and Probability- a tribute to Paul Erdös. Cambridge University Press 1997 .
 Modern Graph Theory. Springer 1998, .
 (ed.): Contemporary Combinatorics. Springer und Janos Bolyai Mathematical Society, Budapest 2002 .
 with Oliver Riordan: Percolation. Cambridge University Press 2006 .
The Art of Mathematics – Coffee Time in Memphis. Cambridge University Press 2006 (with drawings by his wife Gabrielle Bollobás)
 with Robert Kozma, Dezső Miklós: Handbook of Large-Scale Random Networks. Springer 2009, .

References

External links
Interview in the magazine Imprints, Institute of Mathematical Sciences, National University of Singapore
Béla Bollobás on Budapest protest, January 2012

1943 births
Living people
20th-century Hungarian mathematicians
21st-century Hungarian mathematicians
Members of the Hungarian Academy of Sciences
Graph theorists
Fellows of Trinity College, Cambridge
Fellows of the American Mathematical Society
University of Memphis faculty
Fellows of the Royal Society
British people of Hungarian descent
International Mathematical Olympiad participants
Scientists from Budapest
Network scientists